Diathraustodes amoenialis is a moth in the family Crambidae. It was described by Hugo Theodor Christoph in 1881. It is found in Russia (Amur) and Japan.

References

Acentropinae
Moths described in 1881